Glass slipper may refer to:
"Cinderella", the traditional fairy tale also known as "The Little Glass Slipper"
The Glass Slipper (film), a 1955 musical film starring Leslie Caron
The Glass Slipper (novel), a 1938 mystery novel
Glass Slipper (dragster), a 1957 drag racing automobile
Glass Slipper Project, a US charitable prom organization
Glass Slippers, a 2002 South Korean TV drama series
Glass Slippers (horse), a racehorse foaled in 2016